Thomson scattering is the elastic scattering of electromagnetic radiation by a free charged particle, as described by classical electromagnetism. It is the low-energy limit of Compton scattering: the particle's kinetic energy and photon frequency do not change as a result of the scattering. This limit is valid as long as the photon energy is much smaller than the mass energy of the particle: , or equivalently, if the wavelength of the light is much greater than the Compton wavelength of the particle (e.g., for electrons, longer wavelengths than hard x-rays).

Description of the phenomenon
In the low-energy limit, the electric field of the incident wave (photon) accelerates the charged particle, causing it, in turn, to emit radiation at the same frequency as the incident wave, and thus the wave is scattered. Thomson scattering is an important phenomenon in plasma physics and was first explained by the physicist J. J. Thomson. As long as the motion of the particle is non-relativistic (i.e. its speed is much less than the speed of light), the main cause of the acceleration of the particle will be due to the electric field component of the incident wave. In a first approximation, the influence of the magnetic field can be neglected. The particle will move in the direction of the oscillating electric field, resulting in electromagnetic dipole radiation. The moving particle radiates most strongly in a direction perpendicular to its acceleration and that radiation will be polarized along the direction of its motion. Therefore, depending on where an observer is located, the light scattered from a small volume element may appear to be more or less polarized.

The electric fields of the incoming and observed wave (i.e. the outgoing wave) can be divided up into those components lying in the plane of observation (formed by the incoming and observed waves) and those components perpendicular to that plane. Those components lying in the plane are referred to as "radial" and those perpendicular to the plane are "tangential". (It is difficult to make these terms seem natural, but it is standard terminology.)

The diagram on the right depicts the plane of observation. It shows the radial component of the incident electric field, which causes the charged particles at the scattering point to exhibit a radial component of acceleration (i.e., a component tangent to the plane of observation). It can be shown that the amplitude of the observed wave will be proportional to the cosine of χ, the angle between the incident and observed waves. The intensity, which is the square of the amplitude, will then be diminished by a factor of cos2(χ). It can be seen that the tangential components (perpendicular to the plane of the diagram) will not be affected in this way.

The scattering is best described by an emission coefficient which is defined as ε where ε dt dV dΩ dλ is the energy scattered by a volume element  in time dt into solid angle dΩ between wavelengths λ and λ+dλ. From the point of view of an observer, there are two emission coefficients, εr corresponding to radially polarized light and εt corresponding to tangentially polarized light. For unpolarized incident light, these are given by:

The total energy radiated by a volume element  in time dt between wavelengths λ and λ+dλ is found by integrating the sum of the emission coefficients over all directions (solid angle):

The Thomson differential cross section, related to the sum of the emissivity coefficients, is given by

 

expressed in SI units; q is the charge per particle, m the mass of particle, and  a constant, the permittivity of free space. (To obtain an expression in cgs units, drop the factor of 4ε0.) Integrating over the solid angle, we obtain the Thomson cross section

in SI units.

The important feature is that the cross section is independent of photon frequency. The cross section is proportional by a simple numerical factor to the square of the classical radius of a point particle of mass m and charge q, namely

For an electron, the Thomson cross-section is numerically given by:

Examples of Thomson scattering

The cosmic microwave background contains a small linearly-polarized component attributed to Thomson scattering. That polarized component mapping out the so-called E-modes was first detected by DASI in 2002.

The solar K-corona is the result of the Thomson scattering of solar radiation from solar coronal electrons. The ESA and NASA SOHO mission and the NASA STEREO mission generate three-dimensional images of the electron density around the sun by measuring this K-corona from three separate satellites.

In tokamaks, corona of ICF targets and other experimental fusion devices, the electron temperatures and densities in the plasma can be measured with high accuracy by detecting the effect of Thomson scattering of a high-intensity laser beam.

In the Sunyaev-Zeldovich effect, where the photon energy is much less than the electron rest mass, the inverse-Compton scattering can be approximated as Thomson scattering in the rest frame of the electron.

X-ray crystallography is based on Thomson scattering.

See also
Compton scattering
Kapitsa–Dirac effect
Klein–Nishina formula

References

External links
Thomson scattering notes
Thomson scattering: principle and measurements

Atomic physics
Scattering
Plasma physics